Afrobeata magnifica is  a jumping spider species in the genus Afrobeata that lives in Tanzania.

References

Endemic fauna of Tanzania
Fauna of Tanzania
Salticidae
Spiders described in 2000
Spiders of Africa
Taxa named by Wanda Wesołowska